The 1902 VPI football team represented Virginia Agricultural and Mechanical College and Polytechnic Institute in the 1902 college football season. The team was led by their head coach R. R. Brown and finished with a record of three wins, three losses, and one tie (3–2–1).

Schedule

Players
The following players were members of the 1902 football team according to the roster published in the 1903 edition of The Bugle, the Virginia Tech yearbook.

See also
1902 College Football All-Southern Team

References

VPI
Virginia Tech Hokies football seasons
VPI football